Kesayasaya is a Philippine musical sitcom that honours Overseas Filipino Workers and their families in the country. Starred by veteran actors, singers and impersonators and look-alikes of various actors, led by Pilita Corrales, Vina Morales and Robin Padilla, Kesayasaya is the second sitcom (after Hapi ang Buhay) to be produced and aired by Eagle Broadcasting Corporation's Net 25, and shown every Sunday from 6:30 pm to 7:30 pm (PST).

Cast
Vina Morales as Ms. K
Pilita Corrales as Mommy G
Darius Razon as Papa D
Eva Vivar as Mommy Eva
Diego Salvador as Orly
Sherylane Castor as Angie
Cynthia Garcia as Mandyer
Joel Trinidad, Alvin Olalia, Zander Khan, Efren Montes and Lon Mendoza as Senti Boys
Ronnie German as Manny Pa-Cute (Manny Pacquiao look-alike)
Gilbert Orcine as Cheetah-Eh (Rene Requiestas look-alike)
Jonathan Garcia as Boyet de Leon (Christopher de Leon look-alike)
Robin Padilla as Carding Magtanggol
Boobsie Wonderland
Kitkat
Marcelito Pomoy

References

Net 25 original programming
2020 Philippine television series debuts
Philippine television sitcoms
Filipino-language television shows